The first carriages built specifically for The Overland train service operated by the Victorian and South Australian Railways (V & SAR) were introduced in 1949. By the end of 1951, eight new sleeping cars and six new sitting cars had entered service. Additions to the fleet continued until 1972; in all, 44 carriages were built. About eight were still in service in March 2020 on The Overland operated by Journey Beyond. Other carriages have been transferred to different services or sold.

Design

From 1949, new air-conditioned steel carriages gradually entered service on The Overland train between Melbourne and Adelaide. The construction and exterior appearance had been introduced in the South Australian Railways' cafeteria car, built in 1947, and was to be the design precursor of interstate cars in the years that followed.

The livery, in regal red paint with a fluted stainless steel panel on each side and a black roof, remained until the 1990s.

The sitting cars were all organised as eight compartments linked to a side corridor, with different fittings as suited to the type. The first-class cars seated 48, and the second-class cars seated 64. The sleeping cars each held 20 passengers, either in ten compartments for two each, connected to a side corridor; or ten compartments either side of a central corridor.

Construction

Phase one
Six sleeping carriages had been built by the end of 1950; 1951 saw two first-class sitting carriages and a further two sleeping cars entering service, and four second-class sitting cars entered service the following year, for a fleet total of fourteen cars.

Phase two
To respond to growing patronage, a further two sleeping cars were built in each of 1955, 1956, 1957 and 1958. 1960 saw a further two second-class sitting cars constructed, and in 1962 a third first-class sitting car was constructed, to replace composite sitting car 3ABS which was returned to the Victorian Railways fleet.

Phase three
Construction picked up again in 1966, with two more second-class sitting cars built to a slightly modified design, replacing 1ABS and 2ABS which were returned to the VR fleet. The next year saw two further sleeping cars added, then the final two second-class sitting cars entered service in 1968.

Phase four
From 1970, the train underwent significant changes. The last of the E type timber carriages were withdrawn from joint-stock service and split between the South Australian and the Victorian Railways. To replace them, two Luggage Vans (CO), three Club Cars, and four Power Vans (PCO) were built for the train; and the remaining rollingstock was converted away from axle-mounted generator sets to instead take power from the generators fitted to the PCO.

Shortly afterwards, the first three second-class sitting cars (1BJ, 2BJ and 3BJ) had some compartments modified to provide on-train buffet facilities. These were reclassed RBJ. Also around the same time, the Victorian Railways (VR) purchased the South Australian Railways' (SAR) share in the first four Sleeping cars for their use on The Vinelander; these were replaced by 1972 with four new cars, taking on the old identities.

Operations

V & SAR era 1949–1975
Following World War II, the VR and SAR agreed that a major upgrade of The Overland service was needed. At the time, the train was formed using a handful of E type carriages, perhaps with the occasional air-conditioned carriage taken from Victoria's fleet.

To provide for the upgrade, a new design of steel carriages was developed, to replace the worst of the E type sleeping carriages. The first car, Allambi, entered service in 1949 as a roomette sleeper with a central corridor and ten sleeping compartments either side, with room for 20 passengers. The car was fitted with airconditioning and electric lighting, powered by axle-driven generators.

When the carriage was deemed successful, and additional three Roomette sleepers (Tantini, Mururi and Chalaki), and two Twinette sleepers with a side corridor and ten two-berth compartments. These five entered service in 1950, and with Allambi they displaced some of the E Type carriages which were split between the VR and SAR fleets.

Two further sleeping and six sitting cars were added to the fleet over the next few years, for a total of 14 carriages by the end of 1952.

Fit HEP 1970
RBJ 1, 2, 3
Club Cars could've been RAJ

V & ANR era 1975–1997
In 1975, Australian National (AN) took over the South Australian Railways, and the former SAR share of the carriages was transferred across to AN.

In 1986, ANR introduced a new computerised rollingstock tracking system, with the carriages awarded check letters following the first four letters of their names as the class; for example Yanni was officially known as YANN, with check letter K generated by the algorithm.

In 1987, the names were removed and the carriages were reclassed. The sleepers were split into four groups; JRA and JRB for first and second class roomette carriages, and JTA and JTB for first and second class twinette carriages. First Class carriages were from the original batch built 1949–1958, and Second Class from the 1967–1972 batch.

Between 1987 and 1993, the deployment was thus:-

Shared between V/Line and AN
AJ cars 1, 2 and 3
RBJ cars 1, 2 and 3
BJ cars 4–10
Club Cars 1, 2 and 3
Luggage Vans CO 1 and 2
Power Vans PCO 1 through 4
JRA cars 1 through 6 were Mururi, Chalaki, Nankuri, Purpawi, Juki and Tarkinji
JRB cars 1 and 2 were Allambi 2nd and Tantini 2nd
JTA cars 1 through 6 were Nomuldi, Mokai, Malkari, Paiti (later renamed Sir Hans Heysen), Yanni (later renamed Sir John Forrest) and Kuldalai
JTB cars 1 through 4 were Tawarri, Yankai, Weroni 2nd and Dorai 2nd

With V/Line for The Vinelander
Sleeping Cars 11, 13 were Allambi 1st and Tantini 1st; later SJ281, SJ283.
Sleeping Cars 12, 14 were Dorai 1st and Weroni 1st; later SJ282, SJ284.

With the pending gauge conversion of the Adelaide to Melbourne line in 1994–1996 and falling patronage in any case, the oldest cars were withdrawn from service and onsold. The remaining fleet – the sitting cars and the newest of the sleepers – were converted to standard gauge – Sitting cars AJ 1, 2 and 3, Roomettes JRB 1 and 2, and Twinettes JTB 1, 2, 3 and 4.

In 1993, The Vinelander was withdrawn and the V/Line carriages were placed into storage at Newport Workshops, when V/Line was split into Passenger and Freight divisions in 1995, the cars were retained by the Victorian State Government rather than being allocated to either group.

Dispersal 1995
In 1995, the CO, JRA and JTA cars and power van PCO 2 were removed from AN's rolling stock register, marked as withdrawn and scrapped. In actuality, they were sold to International Development Services, who onsold the fleet over the next few years. At the same time, power vans PCO 1 and PCO 3 and Club Car No.1 were sold to V/Line. The latter was renamed Victoria. It is thought that 1CO was successfully sold, but it has been sitting at Islington Railway Workshops for over a decade.

In 1997, JTA 4 and JTA 5 were sold to Blue Bird Rail, then to Grand Corporate Rail. At some point, they were converted to luxury cars, with some bedrooms retained and others converted to an open lounge and dining area; under this form the two became BMC1 and BMC2 respectively. Grand Corporate Rail was forced to stop operating due to the insurance crisis of 2003, so the cars were sold to Great Southern Railway and renamed Sir Hans Heyson and Sir John Forrest in 2003.

In 1998, JTA 6 was privately purchased, and is now under restoration as a static display on private property.

Also in 1998, West Coast Railway purchased cars PCO 2, CO 2, JRA 1, 3 and 4, and JTA 1 and 3. They were transferred to Melbourne on standard gauge bogies, then railed to Ballarat North Workshops for reconditioning and use on excursion trips. When West Coast Railway folded in 2004, the cars were dispersed by the Australian Loco & Railway Carriage Company. PCO 2 was immediately sold to V/Line; in 2009, it was reconditioned and renumbered PCJ493, and it now operates with PCJ491 and 492 (ex PCO 1 and 3) on the standard gauge service from Melbourne to Albury. After PCO 2, the next two sold were JTA 1 and JRA 3, also in 2004. JTA 1 was sold privately, then again in 2012 and is now under restoration on private property in Kyneton. CO 2 and JRA 3 were sold to Rail Experience and held at South Geelong yard, then moved to Newport Workshops in 2012.

In 2007, JRA 1, JRA 4 and JTA 3 were sold by the Australian Loco & Railway Carriage Company to Bluebird Rail Operations. Around the same time, Bluebird acquired JRA 2. All four were refurbished as crew cars, and they re-entered service in the period 2008–2010 as, respectively, RZEY 1, 4 and 3, and QCAY 2; the latter for Queensland Rail.

Not much information is available for JRA 5 or JTA 2 immediately following their purchase by Bluebird Rail. At some point JTA2 was sold to Genesee & Wyoming Australia, and JRA5 was sold to Queensland Rail as QCAY5.

GSR era 1997–2010
On 1 November 1997, the remaining passenger services operated by Australian National were sold to Great Southern Rail (GSR). The sale included the standard gauge Overland passenger fleet – two roomette, four twinette sleepers; three first-class and six second-class sitting cars, three composite second-class sitting with buffet cars and two club cars. Power van PCO4 was also included in the sale, but at the time it was on broad gauge for the short-lived Explorer train, in a dark blue livery with wide yellow bands. It was converted to standard gauge in 1998 and given quick coat of grey paint.

In 1999 the carriages were refurbished and repainted to a plain grey scheme at Keswick, and most of the cars had names applied, recycled from the sleeping carriages. Respectively, 5BJ through 10BJ became Mururu, Nankuri, Purpawi (sic), Chalaki and Tarkinji, and PCO 4 became Paite (sic). The three RBJ cars were all named Kookaburra Club Car; the Club Cars 2 and 3 were classed CCL and named Nomuldi and Malkari. AJ1, 2 and 3, RBJ1, RBJ3 and 4BJ were not named following their refurbishment; and shortly afterwards Chalaki was renamed Kildalai (sic). In 2003 Purpawi was corrected to Purwapi.

Then, in 2002–2003, the fleet was sold to a third party consortium and leased back for operational purposes.

A second refurbishment was undertaken in 2006–2007, applicable mainly to the second-class sitting cars. Retention toilets were fitted, with the male toilets shifted to the former ladies' toilet, and the latter shifted into the former powder room. The original male toilets were converted into showers, allowing the cars to be used on The Ghan and Indian Pacific services if and as necessary. At this time RBJ3 was refitted again, this time named Cafe 828. Similarly, CCL2 "Nomuldi" was upgraded to the "Charles Sturt" Outback Explorer lounge car, re-entering service in 2008; and PCO4 had its name removed, along with door replacements and a general overhaul.

In 2010, GSR was looking at selling parts of the fleet for use as crew cars by other operators.

Subsequent status
In 2011, 8BJ "Mokai", CCL3 "Malkari", RBJ1 and RBJ2 and JRB2 were sold to Genesee & Wyoming Australia and converted to crew cars ADFY1 through 5.

JRB1 was sold to Pacific National and renumbered RZEY2, slotting between RZEY1, 3 and 4. The original RZEY gap was left for Aurizon's QCAY2.

AJ1-3 were also sold though their current ownership is unclear.

As of 2021, the V/Line Passenger Network Service Plan Addenda lists these vehicles as accredited for operation in Victoria:
Great Southern Rail: BJ4-10, BMC2, CCL2, JTB1-4, PCO4 & RBJ3, all Standard Gauge only.
Seymour Railway Heritage Centre, leased to V/Line & 707 Operations: JTA6 "Kuldalai"
Steamrail Victoria, leased to V/Line: SJ283. The Steamrail website also lists SJ282.
V/Line Passenger: PCJ491-493.

Other vehicles were deployed thus:
Pacific National: RZEY1, 2, 3 and 4.
Aurizon: QCAY2 and QCAY5.
CFCL Australia: CDAY1; also AJ 1, AJ 2, AJ 3 stored stripped, not yet converted to crew cars.
Genesee & Wyoming Australia: ADFY1-5, JRA6 and JTA2.
VicTrack Heritage allocated to 707 Operations: Victoria
707 Operations: SJ284
Static displays: JTA1 Nomuldi (The Overland Museum at Kaniva), Allambi (National Railway Museum, Port Adelaide)
Privately owned, stored at Newport Workshops: 2CO, JRA 3 (scrapped early 2020 following fire damage)
Held at Islington Railway Workshops: 1CO

Fleet details

First Class Sitting – AJ
1AJ, 2AJ, 3AJ

Second Class Sitting – BJ
1BJ, 2BJ, 3BJ, 4BJ, 5BJ, 6BJ, 7BJ, 8BJ, 9BJ, 10BJ

Second Class Sitting with Buffet – BRJ
1BRJ, 2BRJ, 3BRJ

Club cars
Club Car No.1, Club Car No.2, Club Car No.3

Sleeping cars
When The Overland service was converted from E type carriages to a new steel, fully airconditioned train, eight new sleeping cars were built. The interiors of these new cars were of a more modern design than the older cars. The roomette cars had a zigzag corridor instead of a straight one, and the compartments had the shape of a trapezium. This enabled the use of the toilet and washbasin units while the bed was still down, not possible in the older roomettes.

In 1949, the classleader, Allambi, entered service, followed by Tantini, Weroni, Dorai, Mururi and Chalaki in 1950 and Nomuldi and Mokai in 1951. Of those, Allambi, Tantini, Mururi and Chalaki were roomette cars with zigzag corridors; the other four were standard compartment-style twinette cars.

The sleeping cars were of two types. Twinette cars had two-berth compartments (as had the E and Mann cars before them), but each compartment had an adjoining toilet and shower room; roomette cars had single-berth compartments either side of a central aisle, and a shower room at the end of the car. The new cars were not numbered, but instead given names based on Aboriginal words related to sleep or dreams.

Additional carriages were built a few years later, with Roomettes Nankuri and Purpawi in 1955, Twinettes Tolkini (later Malkari) and Tandeni (later Paiti) in 1956, Twinettes Yanni and Kuldalai in 1957 and Roomettes Juki and Tarkinji in 1958.

Two further cars were built in 1967, Twinettes Tawarri and Yankai, for a total fleet of eighteen. These last two had a slightly different interior layout.

In 1971, the SAR's share in roomette cars Allambi and Tantini and twinette cars Dorai and Weroni was sold to the Victorian Railways for use on The Vinelander to Mildura. They were repainted dark blue and their names removed; these names were then applied to the same type of new cars built to replace them.

The new sleepers, Weroni and Dorai (1971) and Allambi and Tantini (1972) were built with the altered interior matching the 1967 batch (though Allambi and Tantini were still roomettes).

Under Victorian Railways, the cars had blue painted where maroon had previously been used, with Vinelander nameplates on the carriage sides in place of the names. The cars were numbered as Sleepers Nos 11 to 14, previously Allambi, Tantini, Weroni and Dorai. The New Deal in 1983 saw the four Victorian Railways Sleeper carriages renumbered to SJ 281 to 284, and the carriages were repainted again, this time with orange replacing the blue, with V/Line logos on plates fitted to the left ends.

Under Australian National, the vehicles were allocated classes, with Mururi, Chalaki, Nankuri, Purpawi, Juki and Tarkinji becoming JRA1-6, Nomuldi, Mokai, Tolkini, Tandeni, Yanni and Kuldalai JTA1-6, and Tawarri and Yankai JTB1-2. The second Allambi and Tantini became JRB1-2, and the second Weroni and Dorai JTB3-4. "R" was for Roomette and "T" for Twinette, with "A" or "B" respectively indicating first class for the pre-1967 fleet, or second class for the post-1967 fleet. Therefore it is safe to assume that if the four carriages passed to the Victorian Railways had been retained, they would have been classed as further JRA and JTA units.

Power vans

In the early 1970s, The Overland required head end power for air conditioning and lighting. Prior to this time, all electrical power had been supplied by axle-driven generators. As a result, the two railways between them built four PCO vans, numbered 1 – 4, in 1970. They were Joint Stock vehicles owned and maintained jointly by the VR and SAR, and their later, respective incarnations of VicRail and V/Line (VR), and Australian National (SAR). Each had two  diesel generators and could carry  of luggage. In 1990, the V/Line N class locomotives, which had their own head end power units, took over hauling the Overland and the PCO vans were put into storage.

In 1995, V/Line and Australian National took full ownership of two vans each. V/Line took PCOs 1 and 3, which it renumbered PCJ 491 and 492 respectively, and AN took PCOs 2 and 4. PCO 2 remained in storage until was purchased by West Coast Railway in 1998. When West Coast Railway ceased operation in 2004, it was acquired by V/Line and in 2009 was refurbished and renumbered to PCJ 493. All three PCJ vans were converted to standard gauge in 2011 for use on the V/Line Albury service. Australian National used PCO4 on the short-lived Explorer tour train in South Australia and converted to standard gauge for use again on The Overland. It was completely refurbished in 2007 with new diesel generator sets.

Luggage vans
In 1970, two Joint Stock guards vans were built for the Melbourne to Adelaide The Overland service. They were coded CO, and remained in use until 1994, when they were transferred to Australian National. Both vans were written off of the shared V/Line and Australian National rollingstock register in 1995.

2CO was sold to West Coast Railway in 1998 and transferred to Melbourne in early December of that year. However, there is no evidence that it was ever restored or utilised by that group. In 2004, when West Coast Railway shut down, the carriage was sold to Australian Loco & Railway Carriage Company for the Murraylander service, but quickly passed on to the Geelong-based group Rail Experience.

Model railways

HO Scale

Lima
Lima produced approximations of these carriages.

Trainbuilder
Trainbuilder has produced a brass range of The Overland carriages.

The first series were released as parts of complete The Overland trains.

In 2016/17, a new batch included pairs of Sleepers 11/13 or 12/14 in Vinelander Blue with silver, or SJ281/283 or SJ282/S84 in V/Line Orange and Grey. Pairs of cars sell for $950/pack.

Peter Boormans Workshop (PBW)
PBW produce a range of kits in N-scale (1:160) including roomettes, twinettes, club, dining, CO, PCO, AJ and PJ cars.

Auscision Models
Auscision is making a plastic ready to run range of "The Overland" carriages witj a expected release in 2022

Liveries include: V&SAR Regal Red (1971–1978), V&ANR Regal Red (1978–1989), AN Regal Red (1989–1995), AN/GSR (1995–1999), GSR Grey/Silver (2000–2007), GSR Blue/Purple/Green (2007–2017), GSR Blue (2017 – Present), Vinelander Blue and Silver (Sleeping no's 12 and 14), Vinelander Orange and Silver (SJ281 and SJ283), K&ABR Blue (Kuldalai), West Cost Railways (PCO 2 and Normuldi), VR Heritage Brown (Club Car 1 "Victoria"), V/Line Passenger Mk2 (Club Car 1 "Victoria" and PCO 2), V/Line Passenger Mk3 (PCJ493), V/Line Passenger Mk4/PTV (PCJ492), The Explorer (PCO 4), GSR Silver (PCO 4 2007 – Present) and V/Line Grey (PCJ491)

References

Victorian Railways carriages